B.P.M.: The Very Best of the Beat is a greatest hits album by British ska/new wave band the Beat, released in 1996. The deluxe edition includes a second CD with a selection of extended remixes and dub versions.

Track listing

Bonus disc

References

The Beat (British band) albums
1996 compilation albums
Albums produced by Bob Sargeant